Case Study: LSD is a 1969 anti-drug documentary film produced by Lockheed Corporation. It is one of four anti-drug "case study" shorts produced by Lockheed. Featuring a scene with a hallucinated talking hot dog, it has been described as "backed by strange psychedelic visuals and free of preaching and pat conclusions", "comically exaggerated", "unintentionally funny" "This Is Your Wiener On Drugs" (referencing the 1980s Partnership for a Drug-Free America This Is Your Brain on Drugs campaign), and sarcastically credited for "kickstarting the vegetarian craze".

The short is part of Fantoma Films The Educational Archives ephemeral film DVD series in the Sex & Drugs collection.

See also
Marijuana, a 1968 film also narrated by Sonny Bono

References

External links
Case Study: LSD (1969) at Internet Archive

1969 films
American social guidance and drug education films
Documentary films about LSD
Lockheed Corporation
1960s English-language films
1960s American films